Yi Huiman (born 19 December 1964) is a Chinese banker, and the chairman of China Securities Regulatory Commission. He is the former chairman of the Industrial and Commercial Bank of China.

He is an alternate member of the 19th Central Committee of the Chinese Communist Party.

Biography 
Yi was born in Cangnan County, Zhejiang and graduated from Hangzhou Dianzi University with an associate degree in statistics.

Beginning in 1985, he served in several posts in the Industrial and Commercial Bank of China, including vice president of Zhejiang Branch (1998), president of Jiangsu Branch (2000), and president of Beijing Branch (2005). In May 2008, he became vice president of the bank, rising to president in May 2013. He rose to become chairman of the board of the Industrial and Commercial Bank of China in September 2016, succeeding Jiang Jianqing.

References

1964 births
Living people
Chinese bankers
Businesspeople from Wenzhou
Nanjing University alumni
Alternate members of the 19th Central Committee of the Chinese Communist Party
Politicians from Wenzhou
Chinese Communist Party politicians from Zhejiang
People's Republic of China politicians from Zhejiang